Malaeimi is a village in American Samoa. It is located in Tuālāuta County near Pago Pago, the territorial capital of the island.

Malaeimi is home to a large number of shops and restaurants, including eateries serving native cuisine alongside Filipino, Italian, Vietnamese, and American.

Notable people
 Noah Sewell, American football player
 Penei Sewell, American football player

References 

Tutuila
Villages in American Samoa